Franz Melnitzky (13 November 1822, Krasíkov – 1 February 1876, Vienna) was an Austrian sculptor.

Life and work 
His father was a stonemason, and he was originally trained for the same profession. After deciding to become a sculptor, he went to study in Olmütz, but was dissatisfied there, so he moved to Vienna. His application to the Academy of Fine Arts was rejected, but he was able to take private lessons from Josef Klieber. In 1851, he took a study trip through Germany. A planned trip to Italy never materialized, due to passport issues. When he returned, after a brief period with Hanns Gasser, he set up his own studio.

They were destroyed in 1945, during World War II. He also created four allegorical figures directly above the entrance to what is now the Hotel Imperial, representing wisdom, honor, justice and strength.
 
It was lost when the building was converted to corporate offices in 1955, following the Soviet occupation.

He created another series of allegorical figures for the Nordwestbahnhof, on the departure side, symbolizing cities served by the Austrian Northwestern Railway. This building fell victim to urban development and was demolished in 2015.

Sources 
  
 Felix Czeike, Historisches Lexikon Wien. Vols.1–5, Kremayr & Scheriau, Wien 1992–2004 
 F. Melnitzky, Römisches Grab bei Schwannenstadt. In: Mitteilungen der K. K. Central-Commission zur Erforschung und Erhaltung der Baudenkmale f. Bd. 1883, S. CLVII, Mosaikboden zu Weyregg, ib. S. CLVII.
 Joachim Reiber, "Orpheus in der Oberwelt. Ein Mythos unter dem Dach des Musikvereins", In: Musikverein (magazine), November 2004.

External links 

 Biography and references @ the Wien Geschichte Wiki

1822 births
1876 deaths
Austrian sculptors
Architectural sculptors
People from Tachov District